Timaru Central is the central business district of Timaru, in the South Canterbury area and Canterbury region of New Zealand's South Island.

Demographics

Timaru Central had a population of 405 at the 2018 New Zealand census, a decrease of 21 people (-4.9%) since the 2013 census, and a decrease of 15 people (-3.6%) since the 2006 census. There were 171 households. There were 210 males and 195 females, giving a sex ratio of 1.08 males per female. The median age was 37.4 years (the same as the national median age), with 45 people (11.1%) aged under 15 years, 114 (28.1%) aged 15 to 29, 198 (48.9%) aged 30 to 64, and 48 (11.9%) aged 65 or older.

Ethnicities were 77.0% European/Pākehā, 13.3% Māori, 8.1% Pacific peoples, 10.4% Asian, and 2.2% other ethnicities (totals add to more than 100% since people could identify with multiple ethnicities).

The proportion of people born overseas was 20.0%, compared with 27.1% nationally.

Although some people objected to giving their religion, 45.9% had no religion, 37.8% were Christian, 0.7% were Hindu, 0.7% were Muslim, 2.2% were Buddhist and 5.2% had other religions.

Of those at least 15 years old, 30 (8.3%) people had a bachelor or higher degree, and 93 (25.8%) people had no formal qualifications. The median income was $27,500, compared with $31,800 nationally. 24 people (6.7%) earned over $70,000 compared to 17.2% nationally. The employment status of those at least 15 was that 198 (55.0%) people were employed full-time, 39 (10.8%) were part-time, and 18 (5.0%) were unemployed.

Education

References

Suburbs of Timaru
Populated places in Canterbury, New Zealand
Central business districts in New Zealand